Innerhofer is a Tyrolean surname. Notable people with the surname include:

Christof Innerhofer (born 1984), Italian alpine skier
Ingerborg Innerhofer, Austrian luger
Katharina Innerhofer (born 1991), Austrian biathlete

German-language surnames